In signal processing, a causal filter is a linear and time-invariant causal system. The word causal indicates that the filter output depends only on past and present inputs. A filter whose output also depends on future inputs is non-causal, whereas a filter whose output depends only on future inputs is anti-causal. Systems (including filters) that are realizable (i.e. that operate in real time) must be causal because such systems cannot act on a future input.  In effect that means the output sample that best represents the input at time  comes out slightly later.  A common design practice for digital filters is to create a realizable filter by shortening and/or time-shifting a non-causal impulse response.  If shortening is necessary, it is often accomplished as the product of the impulse-response with a window function.

An example of an anti-causal filter is a maximum phase filter, which can be defined as a stable, anti-causal filter whose inverse is also stable and anti-causal.

Example
The following definition is a moving (or "sliding") average of input data .  A constant factor of 1/2 is omitted for simplicity:

where x could represent a spatial coordinate, as in image processing. A realizable output is

which is a delayed version of the non-realizable output.

Any linear filter (such as a moving average) can be characterized by a function h(t) called its impulse response.  Its output is the convolution

In those terms, causality requires

and general equality of these two expressions requires h(t) = 0 for all t < 0.

Characterization of causal filters in the frequency domain
Let h(t) be a causal filter with corresponding Fourier transform H(ω).  Define the function

which is non-causal.  On the other hand, g(t) is Hermitian and, consequently, its Fourier transform G(ω) is real-valued.  We now have the following relation

where Θ(t) is the Heaviside unit step function.

This means that the Fourier transforms of h(t) and g(t) are related as follows

where  is a Hilbert transform done in the frequency domain (rather than the time domain). The sign of  may depend on the definition of the Fourier Transform.

Taking the Hilbert transform of the above equation yields this relation between "H" and its Hilbert transform:

References

Signal processing
Filter theory